Malaysian Australians refers to Malaysians who have migrated to Australia or Australian-born citizens who are of Malaysian descent. This may include Malays as well as overseas Chinese, Indian, Orang Asal, mixed Malaysians and other groups.

History
Malay labourers were brought over to Australia to work mainly in the copra, sugarcane, pearl diving and trepang industries. In the case of Cocos Islands, the Malays were first brought as slaves under Alexander Hare in 1826, but were then employed as coconut harvesters for copra. Possibly the first Malay immigrant to Australia was a 22-year-old convict named Ajoup who arrived in Sydney on 11 January 1837. Ajoup, described as 'of the Malay faith', had been sentenced in Cape Town, South Africa, to 14 years transportation to New South Wales. He received his ticket of leave—that is, his freedom—in the colony in 1843.

The 1871 colonial census records that 149 Malays were working in Australia as pearl divers in northern and western Australia, labourers in South Australia's mines, and on Queensland's sugar plantations. At Federation in 1901, there were 932 Malay pearl divers in Australia, increasing to 1860 by 1921. In Western Australia and the Northern Territory, Malay pearl divers were recruited through an agreement with the Dutch. By 1875, there were 1800 Malay pearl divers working in Western Australia alone. Most of them returned home when their contracts expired. The Immigration Restriction Act 1901 severely curtailed this community's growth.

Demography

At the 2006 Census 92,335 Australian residents stated that they were born in Malaysia. 64,855 Malaysian born Australian residents declared having Chinese ancestry (either alone or with another ancestry), 12,057 declared a Malay ancestry and 5,848 declared an Indian ancestry. The proportion of Malaysian-born individuals in Australia who claim Chinese ancestry is 70.2%, which is markedly different from the proportion of Malaysians in Malaysia who claim Chinese ancestry (22.9%). The proportion of Malaysians in Australia that claim Indian ancestry (6.3%) is similar to the proportion in Malaysia (7.1%). From these statistics, it is clear that migration from Malaysia to Australia has not reflected a cross-section of Malaysia, but rather, is heavily skewed away from the Malay natives and towards the ethnic Chinese community and to a lesser extent the ethnic Indian community. This is also reflected in the religious statistics, as despite the 60% Muslim majority in Malaysia's domestic population, only 5% of Malaysian-born Australians cited Islam as their religion in the 2006 Census while most others cited either Christianity (43%) or Buddhism (26%) instead.

Slightly more than half (46,445) had Australian citizenship, and 47,521 had arrived in Australia in 1989 or earlier. 32,325 spoke English at home, 24,347 spoke Cantonese, 18,676 spoke Mandarin and 5,329 spoke Bahasa Melayu. Malaysian Australians were resident in Melbourne (29,174), Sydney (21,211) and Perth (18,993).

Notable Malaysian Australians

See also

 Islam in Australia
 Cocos Malays
 Australia–Malaysia relations

References

Further reading
 Cleland, Bilal. The Muslims in Australia: A Brief History. Melbourne: Islamic Council of Victoria, 2002.
 JPS Bach, 'The pearlshelling industry and the "White Australia" policy', Historical Studies, Australia and New Zealand, vol. 10, no. 38, May 1962, pp. 203–213
 Bilal Cleland, Muslims in Australia: A Brief History, www.icv.org.au/history.shtml
 Nahid Kabir, Muslims in Australia: Immigration, Race Relations, and Cultural History, Kegan Paul, London, 2004
 Nahid Kabir, 'Muslims in Western Australia, 1870–1970', Journal of the Royal Western Australian Historical Society, vol. 12, part 5, 2005, pp. 550–565
 L Manderson, 'Malays' in James Jupp (ed.), The Australian People, Angus and Robertson, Sydney, 1988, pp. 691–93
 Daniel Oakman, Facing Asia: A History of the Colombo Plan, Pandanus Press, Canberra, 2004
 Gwenda Tavan, The Long, Slow Death of White Australia, Scribe, Melbourne 2005

External links
History of immigration from Malaysia
Muslim Journeys – Arrivals – Malays
HOUSE OF REPRESENTATIVES – "there was a place called 'Malay Town' set up in Cairns ..."
Malay boy, Broome
  [CC-By-SA] (History of Malaysians in Sydney)

 
 
Malaysia
Australian
Immigration to Australia